Various bands have played thrash metal at some point of their career. The genre evolved in the early 1980s from combining the drum beats of hardcore punk with the guitar style of the new wave of British heavy metal. It emerged partially as a reaction to the more conventional and widely acceptable glam metal, a less aggressive, pop music-infused heavy metal subgenre which appeared simultaneously.

Four American bands, Anthrax, Megadeth, Metallica, and Slayer, are credited with popularizing the genre, earning them the title of the "Big Four of Thrash". In Germany, Destruction, Kreator, Sodom, and Tankard, led the Teutonic thrash metal scene, garnering the nickname "The Big Four of Teutonic Thrash". The Clash of the Titans tour, which featured Megadeth, Slayer, Anthrax, Testament, and Suicidal Tendencies, is considered to be the genre's pinnacle, after which thrash metal saw a decline in popularity throughout the 1990s. Thrash metal has seen a resurgence in recent times, with many of the older bands returning to their roots with their new releases. A new generation of thrash metal bands emerged in the early 2000s, drawing lyrical and visual inspiration from the older groups.

Thrash metal was an inspiration for later extreme genres such as death metal and black metal. This list also includes certain bands which belong to the first wave of black metal. These bands essentially played thrash metal with a heavy emphasis on Satanic and occult themes in the lyrics and imagery. Over the years, thrash metal has developed a few subgenres of its own, such as crossover thrash and groove metal.

0–9

A

B

C

D

E

F

G

H

I

K

L

M

N

O

P

R

S

T

U

V

W

X

Y

Z

See also

 Heavy metal music
 List of heavy metal bands
 List of crossover thrash bands
 List of groove metal bands

References

Lists of extreme heavy metal bands